Jennifer Marie Leeper (born April 27, 1984) is an American politician serving as an elected official in the Connecticut General Assembly. She represents parts of Southport and Fairfield, comprising Connecticut's 132nd assembly district.

Early life and education 
Leeper was born and raised in New Hampshire, before attending Wellesley College, where she double majored in political science and religious studies. She earned a master's degree in public policy from the University of Chicago, then worked in New York City before moving to Fairfield, Connecticut.

Political career 
Leeper began her public service career as an elected member of the Fairfield Board of Education (2017-2020). Leeper narrowly lost a Special Election in January 2020 by 79 votes for the Connecticut 132nd House district before winning the seat in the general election later that year.

Leeper currently serves as the Vice Chair of the Human Services committee and on the Commerce, and Education committees.

References

External links 

Democratic Party members of the Connecticut House of Representatives
21st-century American politicians
1984 births
Living people
21st-century American women politicians
Women state legislators in Connecticut
Wellesley College alumni
University of Chicago alumni
School board members in Connecticut